Mogwai Young Team (also known as Young Team) is the debut studio album by Scottish post-rock band Mogwai. Produced by Paul Savage and Andy Miller, the album was released on 21 October 1997 through the Chemikal Underground record label.

Mogwai Young Team was re-released in May 2008 on Chemikal Underground, packaged as a remaster of the original album with a second disc containing rare tracks from the Young Team sessions and live recordings. Of the second disc, only "Young Face Gone Wrong" was previously unreleased; the following three tracks had earlier appeared on various compilation albums and other releases.

Overview

Mogwai Young Team was recorded in summer 1997 at MCM Studios (now known as Gargleblast Studios) in Hamilton, Scotland, and was produced by Paul Savage and Andy Miller. It is largely instrumental, with one notable exception ("R U Still in 2 It", which features vocals from Aidan Moffat of Arab Strap), although many songs feature recordings of various individuals speaking, whether over the phone ("Tracy"), reading ("Yes! I Am a Long Way from Home"), or just rambling ("Katrien"). It features limited instrumentation, consisting mainly of guitar, bass and drums, although other instruments can sometimes be heard throughout the album, such as glockenspiel ("Tracy"), piano ("Radar Maker", "With Portfolio", "A Cheery Wave from Stranded Youngsters") and flute ("Mogwai Fear Satan"). The band had only written three of the songs before they entered the studio.

The cover, a photo taken and inverted by Brendan O'Hare, is of a Fuji Bank branch (since acquired by Mizuho Financial Group) located in Shibuya, Tokyo, Japan. The "MYT" logo found inside the cover was created by Adam Piggot and is based on a popular mark used by young gangs in Glasgow, Scotland; a "Young Team" is specific to an area: "Sighthill Young Team", for example.

The band took up pseudonyms for the liner notes on the album. Stuart Braithwaite was dubbed pLasmatroN. John Cummings took the nickname Cpt. Meat after his obsession for eating chops. Martin Bulloch adopted the alias bionic because of his heart pacemaker. Dominic Aitchison chose the name DEMONIC because of his childhood fear and nightmares of Lucifer, which would also inspire the album's end song Mogwai Fear Satan. Brendan O'Hare, who was the oldest of the group by six years at 27 and had already been in several recording bands, was named +the relic+.

Reception

Mogwai Young Team peaked at number 75 on the UK Albums Chart. The album sold more than 60,000 copies in the United Kingdom.

In 2003, Mogwai Young Team was listed at number 97 on Pitchforks Top 100 Albums of the 1990s.

Track listing

Personnel
Mogwai
 Stuart Braithwaite (listed as "pLasmatroN")  – guitar, glockenspiel
 Dominic Aitchison (listed as "DEMONIC") – bass guitar
 Martin Bulloch (listed as "bionic") – drums
 John Cummings (listed as "Cpt. Meat") – guitar
 Brendan O'Hare (listed as "+the relic+") – piano, guitar

Additional musicians
 Barry Burns – backmasked monologue on "Yes! I Am a Long Way from Home"
 Mari Myren – monologue on "Yes! I Am a Long Way from Home"
 Aidan Moffat – vocals on "R U Still in 2 It"
 Shona Brown – flute on "Mogwai Fear Satan"

Production
 Paul Savage – production
 Andy Miller – production

Artwork and design
 Keith Cameron – liner notes (for 2008 deluxe reissue)
 Brendan O'Hare – cover photography
 Neale Smith – photography

Charts

Certifications

Release history

Notes

External links

Mogwai albums
1997 debut albums
Chemikal Underground albums